This is a list of Swedish engineer regiments, battalions, corps and companies of the Swedish Engineer Troops that have existed in the Swedish Army. They are listed in three ways, first by the actual units that have existed, then by the various names these units have had, and last by the various designations these units have had.

By unit 
Sappörkompaniet (1855–1864)
Sappörkåren (1864–1867)
Pontonjärbataljonen (1867–1892)
Svea ingenjörbataljon (1893–1902)
Ing 1 Svea ingenjörkår (1902–1957, 1994–1997)
Ing 1 Svea ingenjörregemente (1957–1994)
Sappörbataljonen (1873–1892)
Göta ingenjörbataljon (1893–1902)
Ing 2 Göta ingenjörkår (1902–1963, 1994–2000)
Ing 2 Göta ingenjörregemente (1963–1994, 2000– )
Ing 3 Fälttelegrafkåren (1902–1937)
Ing 3 Bodens ingenjörkår (1937–1975)
Ing 3 Bodens ingenjörregemente (1975–1994)
Ing 3 Norrlands ingenjörkår (1994–2000)
Ing 4 Bodens ingenjörkår (1902–1937)

By name 
Bodens ingenjörkår
Bodens ingenjörregemente
Göta ingenjörbataljon
Göta ingenjörkår
Göta ingenjörregemente
Norrlands ingenjörbataljon
Norrlands ingenjörkår
Pontonjärbataljonen
Sappörkompaniet
Sappörbataljonen
Sappörkåren
Sappörtruppen
Svea ingenjörbataljon
Svea ingenjörkår
Svea ingenjörregemente

By designation 
 Ing 1 - Svea Engineer Regiment (1957–1994)
 Ing 2 - Göta Engineer Regiment (1963–1994)
 Ing 3 - Boden Engineer Regiment (1937–2000)
 Ing 4 - Boden Engineer Regiment (1905–1937)
 Ingbat/I 19 (2000–2005)

See also 
List of Swedish regiments
Military district (Sweden)
List of Swedish defence districts

References 
Print

Online

 
engineer